Iraq national school football team is a team representing Iraq in the schools competitions.

Pan Arab School Games Record
Recent Pan Arab School Games editions record.

References

External links
Official website

Iraq national football team